Alan Bluechel (August 28, 1924 – August 20, 2013) was an American politician in the state of Washington. He served in the Washington House of Representatives from 1967 to 1975 and in the Senate from 1975 to 1995. He was also a former president pro tempore of the Senate. He was a Republican.

References

2013 deaths
1924 births
Republican Party Washington (state) state senators
Republican Party members of the Washington House of Representatives
Politicians from Edmonton
Canadian emigrants to the United States
People from Bellevue, Washington